Carabus concolor is a species of beetle from ground beetle family that can be found in Italy, Liechtenstein, and Switzerland. The species are brown coloured.

References

concolor
Beetles described in 1792
Beetles of Europe